National Highway 31 is a major highway of central/northeastern Burma. The major settlements the road passes through from Mandalay are as follows: Lamaing, Madaya, Yentha, Letkhokpin, Chaunggyi, Shwenyaungbin, Kyatpyin, Mogok, Mong Nit, Pinkyein, Tonkwa, Madangyang, Bhamo, Myothit, Dawhpumyang, Kaxu before finally arriving in Waingmaw.

References

Roads in Myanmar
Mandalay
Mandalay Region
Kachin State